The Iberian grey shrike (Lanius meridionalis) is a member of the shrike family. It is closely related to the great grey shrike, Lanius excubitor, and its plumage is generally similar to the great grey shrike apart from the differences noted below. The Iberian was previously considered conspecific with the great grey; where they co-occur, they do not interbreed and are separated by choice of habitat.

Taxonomy and systematics
The genus name, Lanius, is derived from the Latin word for "butcher", and some shrikes are also known as "butcher birds" because of their feeding habits. The specific meridionalis is Latin for "southern". The common English name "shrike" is from Old English scríc, "shriek", referring to the shrill call.

It is resident in southern Europe. It is slightly smaller and darker than the great grey shrike, and prefers dry open country.

Behaviour and ecology

This medium-sized passerine bird eats large insects, small birds and rodents. Like other shrikes it hunts from prominent perches, and impales corpses on thorns or barbed wire as a "larder".

References

Bibliography

Identification

 Jorma Tenovuo & Juha Varrela (1998) Identification of the Great Grey Shrike complex in Europe Alula 4(1): 4 - 11
Clement, Peter, and Tim Worfolk (1995) Southern and eastern Great Grey Shrikes in northwest Europe Birding World 8(8) 300-309

External links

Ageing and sexing (PDF; 4.7 MB) by Javier Blasco-Zumeta & Gerd-Michael Heinze
 
 

Iberian grey shrike
Birds of Southern Europe
Iberian grey shrike